Kulbakovo (Qolbaq) is a rural locality (a village) in Arslanovsky Selsoviet, Kiginsky District, Bashkortostan, Russia. The population was 322 as of 2010. There are 4 streets.

Geography 
Kulbakovo is located 46 km southeast of Verkhniye Kigi (the district's administrative centre) by road. Asylguzhino is the nearest rural locality.

References 

Rural localities in Kiginsky District